Plumsted Township is a township in Ocean County, New Jersey, United States. As of the 2010 United States Census, the township's population was 8,421, reflecting an increase of 1,146 (+15.8%) from the 7,275 counted in the 2000 Census, which had in turn increased by 1,270 (+21.1%) from the 6,005 counted in the 1990 Census. The 2010 population was the highest recorded in any decennial census.

Plumsted Township was incorporated as a township by an act of the New Jersey Legislature on March 11, 1845, from portions of Jackson Township, while the area was still part of Monmouth County. Plumsted Township became part of the newly created Ocean County on February 15, 1850. The township was named for Clement Plumstead, an English Quaker who bought a large parcel of land, but never set foot in the area.

At one time, Plumsted included five separate Superfund sites, four of which have been removed from the National Priorities List, the most of any township in New Jersey.

Geography
According to the United States Census Bureau, the township had a total area of 39.53 square miles (102.37 km2), including 39.14 square miles (101.36 km2) of land and 0.39 square miles (1.01 km2) of water (0.99%).

New Egypt (with a 2010 Census population of 2,512) is an unincorporated community and census-designated place (CDP) located within Plumsted Township.

Unincorporated communities, localities and place names located partially or completely within the township include Archertown, Brindle Park, Head of Woods, Hockamick, Pinehurst Estates and Woodruff.

Colliers Mills Wildlife Management Area is a  wildlife management area located within portions of both Plumsted Township and Jackson Township, operated by the New Jersey Department of Environmental Protection's Division of Fish and Wildlife.

The township borders Jackson Township and Manchester Township in Ocean County; New Hanover Township, North Hanover Township and Pemberton Township in Burlington County; and Upper Freehold Township in Monmouth County.

Community
The community has a volunteer fire station, a first aid station, and a police department. New Egypt has a supermarket, a funeral home (www.tilghmanfh.com) the New Egypt Market Place (formerly the IGA), a bike store (Mid Atlantic X-treme Sports), two barber shops, an auto body (New Egypt Auto Body), two diners, a general store and a few other small stores downtown. It is also home to seven churches: Assumption Roman Catholic Church, Bible Baptist Church, Church of Christ, Church of the Nazarene, New Egypt United Methodist Church, Plumsted Presbyterian Church, and The Christian Fellowship Church of New Egypt. Oakford Lake is located in the middle of the town. In the early 1900s the location thrived as a tourist and vacation attraction.

New Egypt has a recreation field which includes four baseball fields, a football field, two softball fields, and a basketball court and three small fields used for tee ball.

Demographics

Census 2010

The Census Bureau's 2006–2010 American Community Survey showed that (in 2010 inflation-adjusted dollars) median household income was $73,790 (with a margin of error of +/− $8,323) and the median family income was $89,279 (+/− $12,381). Males had a median income of $54,614 (+/− $8,958) versus $46,886 (+/− $3,261) for females. The per capita income for the borough was $31,719 (+/− $2,499). About 4.4% of families and 7.3% of the population were below the poverty line, including 11.0% of those under age 18 and 9.6% of those age 65 or over.

Census 2000
As of the 2000 United States Census there were 7,275 people, 2,510 households, and 2,002 families residing in the township. The racial makeup of the township was 93.90% White, 2.30% African American, 0.14% Native American, 0.73% Asian, 0.01% Pacific Islander, 1.36% from other races, and 1.57% from two or more races. Hispanic or Latino of any race were 3.85% of the population.

There were 2,510 households, out of which 41.1% had children under the age of 18 living with them, 67.0% were married couples living together, 9.3% had a female householder with no husband present, and 20.2% were non-families. 15.9% of all households were made up of individuals, and 5.3% had someone living alone who was 65 years of age or older. The average household size was 2.90 and the average family size was 3.22.

In the township the population was spread out, with 28.5% under the age of 18, 7.1% from 18 to 24, 34.0% from 25 to 44, 22.0% from 45 to 64, and 8.5% who were 65 years of age or older. The median age was 36 years. For every 100 females, there were 99.0 males. For every 100 females age 18 and over, there were 97.1 males.

The median income for a household in the township was $61,357, and the median income for a family was $62,255. Males had a median income of $42,610 versus $34,355 for females. The per capita income for the township was $22,433. About 4.3% of families and 5.0% of the population were below the poverty line, including 5.2% of those under age 18 and 4.2% of those age 65 or over.

Government

Local government 
Plumsted Township is governed under the Township form of New Jersey municipal government, one of 141 municipalities (of the 564) statewide that use this form, the second-most commonly used form of government in the state. The Township Committee is comprised of five members, who are elected directly by the voters at-large in partisan elections to serve three-year terms of office on a staggered basis, with either one or two seats coming up for election each year as part of the November general election. At an annual reorganization meeting held during the first week of January, the Township Committee selects one of its members to serve as Mayor and another as Deputy Mayor, and appoints from its members a liaison for each of the Township's administrative departments.

, the members of the Plumsted Township Committee are Mayor Robert W. Bowen (R, term of office on committee and as mayor ends December 31, 2022), Deputy Mayor Herbert F. Marinari (R, term on committee and as deputy mayor ends 2022), Thomas Calabrese (R, 2024), Dominick Cuozzo (R, 2024) and Leonard A. Grilletto (R, 2023).

In April 2019, the Township Committee appointed Leonard A. Grilletto to fill the seat expiring in December 2020 that had been held by Larry Jones until he resigned from office. In the November 2019 general election, Grilletto was elected to serve the balance of the term of office.

In November 2014, following the resignation of former mayor David Leutwyler, who accepted a position as the township's community development coordinator, the Township Committee selected Vince Lotito from three names recommended by the Republican municipal committee to fill the vacant seat on the committee and chose Jack Trotta to serve as mayor.

Federal, state and county representation 
Plumsted Township is located in the 4th Congressional District and is part of New Jersey's 12th state legislative district. Prior to the 2011 reapportionment following the 2010 Census, Plumsted Township had been in the 30th state legislative district.

 

Ocean County is governed by a Board of County Commissioners comprised of five members who are elected on an at-large basis in partisan elections and serving staggered three-year terms of office, with either one or two seats coming up for election each year as part of the November general election. At an annual reorganization held in the beginning of January, the board chooses a Director and a Deputy Director from among its members. , Ocean County's Commissioners (with party affiliation, term-end year and residence) are:

Commissioner Director John P. Kelly (R, 2022, Eagleswood Township),
Commissioner Deputy Director Virginia E. Haines (R, 2022, Toms River),
Barbara Jo Crea (R, 2024, Little Egg Harbor Township)
Gary Quinn (R, 2024, Lacey Township) and
Joseph H. Vicari (R, 2023, Toms River). Constitutional officers elected on a countywide basis are 
County Clerk Scott M. Colabella (R, 2025, Barnegat Light),
Sheriff Michael G. Mastronardy (R, 2022; Toms River) and
Surrogate Jeffrey Moran (R, 2023, Beachwood).

Politics
As of March 23, 2011, there were a total of 4,979 registered voters in Plumsted Township, of which 816 (16.4%) were registered as Democrats, 1,537 (30.9%) were registered as Republicans and 2,623 (52.7%) were registered as Unaffiliated. There were 3 voters registered Libertarians or Greens. Among the township's 2010 Census population, 59.1% (vs. 63.2% in Ocean County) were registered to vote, including 80.1% of those ages 18 and over (vs. 82.6% countywide).

In the 2012 presidential election, Republican Mitt Romney received 59.3% of the vote (2,179 cast), ahead of Democrat Barack Obama with 38.9% (1,428 votes), and other candidates with 1.8% (67 votes), among the 3,709 ballots cast by the township's 5,262 registered voters (35 ballots were spoiled), for a turnout of 70.5%. In the 2008 presidential election, Republican John McCain received 56.7% of the vote (2,192 cast), ahead of Democrat Barack Obama with 40.7% (1,573 votes) and other candidates with 1.7% (65 votes), among the 3,865 ballots cast by the township's 5,176 registered voters, for a turnout of 74.7%. In the 2004 presidential election, Republican George W. Bush received 63.2% of the vote (2,268 ballots cast), outpolling Democrat John Kerry with 35.2% (1,264 votes) and other candidates with 0.9% (43 votes), among the 3,589 ballots cast by the township's 4,812 registered voters, for a turnout percentage of 74.6.

In the 2013 gubernatorial election, Republican Chris Christie received 75.9% of the vote (1,828 cast), ahead of Democrat Barbara Buono with 21.9% (528 votes), and other candidates with 2.1% (51 votes), among the 2,459 ballots cast by the township's 5,219 registered voters (52 ballots were spoiled), for a turnout of 47.1%. In the 2009 gubernatorial election, Republican Chris Christie received 70.2% of the vote (1,917 ballots cast), ahead of  Democrat Jon Corzine with 22.5% (615 votes), Independent Chris Daggett with 4.6% (125 votes) and other candidates with 1.6% (44 votes), among the 2,732 ballots cast by the township's 5,075 registered voters, yielding a 53.8% turnout.

Education 
The Plumsted Township School District educates students in public school for kindergarten though twelfth grade, including special education students in pre-kindergarten. As of the 2019–20 school year, the district, comprised of three schools, had an enrollment of 1,216 students and 126.6 classroom teachers (on an FTE basis), for a student–teacher ratio of 9.6:1. Schools in the district (with 2019–20 enrollment data from the National Center for Education Statistics) are 
Dr. Gerald H. Woehr Elementary School with 538 students in grades Pre-K–5, 
New Egypt Middle School with 294 students in grades 6–8 and 
New Egypt High School with 375 students in grades 9–12.

Transportation

Roads and highways

The closest limited access road is Interstate 195, which is accessible in neighboring Upper Freehold Township and Jackson Township.

Public transportation
NJ Transit provides bus service between the township and Philadelphia on the 317 bus route.

Ocean Ride local service is provided on the Shoppers Loop route.

Wineries
 Laurita Winery

Communications 
Plumsted is the only municipality in Ocean County that receives a different Comcast cable feed which is out of Mount Holly, Burlington County. This means that for local broadcast channels, Plumsted receives stations from the Philadelphia area and does not receive any New York City stations.

In addition, Plumsted has local telephone calling with Bordentown, Fort Dix and Pemberton in Burlington County, as well as Allentown in Monmouth County, but not with any exchanges in Ocean County.

Notable people

People who were born in, residents of, or otherwise closely associated with Plumsted Township include:

 Deena Nicole Cortese (born 1987), reality television personality who appeared on the MTV reality show Jersey Shore
 Ronald S. Dancer (1949–2022), member of the New Jersey General Assembly who served as mayor of Plumsted Township from 1990 to 2011
 Stanley Dancer (1927–2005), harness racing driver and trainer
 George Franklin Fort (1809–1872), physician, judge and politician who served as the 16th Governor of New Jersey from 1851 to 1854
 Keith Jones, news anchor and reporter for WCAU in Philadelphia
 Duke Lacroix (born 1993), professional soccer player who plays as a forward for Indy Eleven in the North American Soccer League
 Edgar O. Murphy (1878–1959), politician who served as Mayor of Farmingdale, New Jersey and as a member of the Monmouth County Board of Chosen Freeholders
 Stephen Panasuk (born 1989), quarterback for the Cleveland Gladiators of the Arena Football League
 Travis Ward (born 1996), soccer player who plays as a forward for Michigan Stars FC in the National Independent Soccer Association

References

External links

Plumsted Township website

 
1845 establishments in New Jersey
Populated places established in 1845
Township form of New Jersey government
Townships in Ocean County, New Jersey